Kullapa Piampongsan (born 11 February 1989 in Rayong) is a Thai indoor volleyball player. She is a member of the Thailand women's national volleyball team.

Career
She was awarded Best Setter.

In 2018 she played with the local Supreme Chonburi on loan.

She is on the list 2019 Korea-Thailand all star super match competition.

Clubs
  Nonthaburi (2011–2014)
  King-Bangkok (2015–2016)
  Khonkaen Star (2017–2019)
  Diamond Food (2019–Present)

Awards

Individuals
 2018–19 Thailand League – "Best Setter"

Club
 2018 Asian Club Championship –  Champion, with Supreme Chonburi

References

External links
 FIVB Biography

1991 births
Living people
Gullapa Piampongsan
Gullapa Piampongsan
Gullapa Piampongsan
Gullapa Piampongsan
Gullapa Piampongsan